"Don't Wanna Think About You" is a song by Canadian rock band Simple Plan. It appeared on the soundtrack to the film Scooby-Doo 2: Monsters Unleashed, serving as the film's theme song. The song was released to iTunes through Warner Bros. Records and to radio on March 2, 2004 in promotion of the film.

Track listing
Digital download
 "Don't Wanna Think About You" (from Scooby-Doo 2: Monsters Unleashed) – 3:26

Music video
The music video for "Don't Wanna Think About You" was directed by Smith n' Borin and premiered February 27, 2004. An edited version was made available for purchase on iTunes on January 11, 2006. The video is also included in the special features on the DVD for Scooby Doo 2: Monsters Unleashed.

The story for the video revolves around the band members racing through the city trying to reach the premiere of Scooby Doo 2  on time. To give their trek a sense of urgency, the video uses the on-screen digital clock concept of the show 24, although compressed for the duration of the song. The Mystery Machine and the cast of the film are featured briefly as the band arrives at the theatre.

Two versions of the music video exist: One version of the video shows that the time frame of the video is 5:00 pm to 6:00 pm. Another version formerly embedded on Bouvier's official Myspace page has the time frame of the video as 4:00 pm to 5:00 pm, and used official sounds from the 24 TV series.

Chart performance

References

External links
"Don't Wanna Think About You" on YouTube, a version of the music video

Simple Plan songs
2004 singles
2004 songs
Warner Records singles
Songs written by David Desrosiers
Songs written by Pierre Bouvier
Songs written by Chuck Comeau
Songs written by Sébastien Lefebvre
Songs written by Jeff Stinco
Scooby-Doo music
Scooby-Doo (film series)